LJF may refer to:

London Jazz Festival
London Jewish Forum
Lecsinel Jean-François
Litchfield Municipal Airport (Minnesota)